Portraits Plus is an album by the jazz pianist Stan Tracey. It was released in 1993 and was shortlisted for the 1993 Mercury Prize.

Critical reception

AllMusic called "Newk's Fluke" "a chugging, engaging post-bop vehicle which includes a blend of Latin and Brazilian rhythms and potent ensembles."

References

1993 albums
Blue Note Records albums